Alloy Entertainment (formerly Daniel Weiss Associates and 17th Street Productions) is a book packaging and television production unit of Warner Bros. Television Studios. It produces books, television series, and feature films.

Alloy Entertainment produces approximately thirty new books a year, which are published globally in more than forty languages. More than eighty of Alloy Entertainment’s books have reached The New York Times Best Seller list, including most recently Everything, Everything and The Sun is Also a Star by Nicola Yoon, The Thousandth Floor by Katharine McGee, Max by Jennifer Li Shotz and 99 Days by Katie Cotugno. Past bestselling franchises The Sisterhood of the Traveling Pants, Gossip Girl, The Vampire Diaries, Pretty Little Liars, The Lying Game, The 100, The Clique, The Luxe, and The A-List have sold tens of millions of copies worldwide. Among the television series produced by the company are Privileged, The Vampire Diaries, Gossip Girl, Pretty Little Liars, The Originals, Legacies and The 100.

Additionally, the company produces or co-produces several television shows and films which are novel adaptations.

History 
Daniel Weiss Associates was founded in January 1987 as a book packaging company. In 1997, the division 17th Street Productions was created to specialize in young adult fiction.

In January 2000, 17th Street Productions was sold to Alloy, Inc. (later Alloy Digital), and was renamed Alloy Entertainment. Led by Leslie Morgenstein, the division became a frequent partner with publishers and studios to produce film and television adaptations of young adult books.

On June 11, 2012, Alloy Digital's majority owner ZelnickMedia divested Alloy Entertainment and sold it to Warner Bros. Television, which Time Warner owned until AT&T's acquisition in 2018, after which it became WarnerMedia.

Franchises

Filmography

Films

Television films

Television series

Web series

References

External links

 

 
1996 establishments in New York (state)
American companies established in 1996
Mass media companies established in 1996
Warner Bros. Television Studios
Warner Bros. divisions
Marketing companies of the United States
Book packagers
Entertainment companies based in New York City
2012 mergers and acquisitions